Prabesh Gurung (born 28 June 1992) is an Indian cricketer. He made his Twenty20 debut on 14 November 2019, for Sikkim in the 2019–20 Syed Mushtaq Ali Trophy.

References

External links
 

1992 births
Living people
Indian cricketers
Sikkim cricketers
Place of birth missing (living people)